Luiz Henrique Camargo (born 4 May 1987 in Vinhedo) is a Brazilian footballer.

Club career 

Luiz Camargo began his career in his native Brazil with Mogi Mirim. In 2009, he moved to Brazilian second division side Paraná, where he quickly established himself as a starter in central midfield for the club.

During the 2011 season, Camargo was sent on loan to Major League Soccer side Houston Dynamo. He joined a struggling Dynamo side during the latter part of the 2011 season. Camargo and his teammates' late-season performances led the club to a playoff berth and eventual place in the 2011 MLS Cup Final. At the conclusion of the season, Houston reached an agreement with Paraná to retain the Brazilian's services. Camargo played his first match of 2012 in a 1–0 reserve division win over the Colorado Rapids. In 2013 Camargo has scored 1 goal in three Dynamo reserve games showing confidence while controlling the flow of play for the dynamo on the field.

Camargo was waived by Houston on 26 June 2013.

Personal life 

On 15 March 2012, Camargo's wife gave birth to the couple's son named Pedro in Houston, Texas.

References

External links 

 
 
 esporte.ig 
 Profile

1987 births
Living people
Footballers from São Paulo (state)
Brazilian footballers
Brazilian expatriate footballers
Brazilian expatriate sportspeople in the United States
Mogi Mirim Esporte Clube players
Paraná Clube players
Houston Dynamo FC players
Expatriate soccer players in the United States
Major League Soccer players
Association football midfielders